Yaylabaşı can refer to:

 Yaylabaşı, Erzincan
 Yaylabaşı, Osmancık
 Yaylabaşı, Olur